Yoel Rephaeli is an Israeli-American cosmologist. He is a Professor of Physics at Tel Aviv University, Israel. Rephaeli studies the Sunyaev-Zel'dovich effect  and the astrophysics of galaxy clusters.

References

External links
 Y. Rephaeli, "Comptonization Of The Cosmic Microwave Background: The Sunyaev-Zeldovich Effect", Annual Review of Astronomy and Astrophysics, Volume 33, 1995, pp. 541–580., Volume 33, 1995, pp. 541–580.

Israeli educators
Living people
Year of birth missing (living people)
Academic staff of Tel Aviv University